Kirkos (Amharic: ቂርቆስ ክፍለ ከተማ), also spelled Kerkos, Kirikos or Cherkos, is a district of Addis Ababa, Ethiopia. As of 2011 its population was of 235,441.

Geography
The district is located in the city centre, and borders with the districts of Arada, Yeka, Bole, Nifas Silk-Lafto and Lideta.

Education

The African Union Branch (Grades 1-8) of Nejashi Ethio-Turkish International Schools is in the Kirkos/OAU area.

List of places
 Bantyiketu
 Beg Tera
 Beherawi
 Beklo Bet
 Bulgariya Sefer
 Enderase
 Gotera
 Kasanchis
 Kera
 Lancha
 Legehar
 Menaheriya Kasanchis
 Meshualekiya
 Meskel Flower
 Mexico
 Olympia
 Riche
 Sar Bet
 Wello Sefer

See also
Meskel Square
Addis Ababa railway station

References

External links

Districts of Addis Ababa